"Sunshine Girl" is Japanese band Moumoon's 8th single, released on May 12, 2010. It achieved success after a high-profile commercial campaign for Shiseido's Anessa range of sunblock cosmetics. It is currently Moumoon's only top 10 single, and their most successful single in terms of physical copies sold and digital certifications (it is the only Moumoon song to receive a certification by the RIAJ).

An English-language version with the same arrangement was released on the group's EP Spark later in 2010.

Promotion 
The song was first unveiled in Shiseido commercial campaign for Anessa, starting on March 19. The song was also later used in commercials for Sony Ericsson's Xperia smartphones, and was one of the songs used in Sony's bid for the Guinness World Records' award for greatest number of different commercials played in a single television show selling the same product.

The song was performed at Music Station on July 30.

Track listing

Chart rankings and certifications

Sales and certifications

Release history

References

External links
Avex "Sunshine Girl" profile 

2010 singles
Avex Trax singles
RIAJ Digital Track Chart number-one singles
2010 songs